The United States Post Office in Attalla, Alabama, was built in 1931.  It was listed on the National Register of Historic Places in 1983.

See also 
List of United States post offices

References 

Federal architecture in Alabama
Government buildings completed in 1931
National Register of Historic Places in Etowah County, Alabama
Attalla